Real Beat festival is the first high grade reggae/dancehall festival in the Czech Republic. The festival was held from 2000 to 2006 under the name Reggae Ethnic Session. The first edition with the current name took place in 2007 under the Točník castle. The main headliner was the famous Jamaican singer Anthony B.

Real Beat also does other concerts during the year in Prague (Capleton, Gentleman...).

Real Beat line-up in 2007 
 Anthony B (JAM)
 YT (UK)
 TOP CAT (UK)
 BONGO CHILLI (JAM)
 BIG FAMILI (MARTINIQUE/FR)
 IRIE REVOLTES (FR/DE)
 DUBIOZA KOLEKTIV (BOSNA)
 UNITED FLAVOUR (CZ/ESP)
 EAST WEST ROCKERS (PL)

+ Many Czech bands and DJs

See also
List of reggae festivals
Reggae

References

External links 

 Official festival site
 JahMusic
 2007 festival poster
 photogallery

Reggae festivals
Music festivals in the Czech Republic
Recurring events established in 2000